All American Sweetheart is a 1937 American crime film directed by Lambert Hillyer and written by Grace Neville, Fred Niblo Jr. and Michael L. Simmons. The film stars Patricia Farr, Scott Kolk, Gene Morgan, James Eagles, Arthur Loft and Joe Twerp. The film was released on December 20, 1937, by Columbia Pictures.

Plot

Cast          
Patricia Farr as Connie Adams
Scott Kolk as Lance Corbett 
Gene Morgan as Coach Dolan
James Eagles as 'Squirt' Adams 
Arthur Loft as Cap Collender
Joe Twerp as 'Giblets' Offenbach
Ruth Hilliard as Amy Goss
Donald Briggs as Johnny Ames
Louis DaPron as Andy Carter
Joseph Allen as Joe Collins 
Frank C. Wilson as Alfred
Deane Janis as Singer

References

External links
 

1937 films
American crime drama films
1937 crime drama films
Columbia Pictures films
Films directed by Lambert Hillyer
American black-and-white films
1930s English-language films
1930s American films